A by-election was held for the Australian House of Representatives seat of Grampians on 27 October 1917. This was triggered by the death of Nationalist MP and former Speaker Carty Salmon.

The by-election was won by Nationalist candidate Edmund Jowett, who was also endorsed by the Victorian Farmers' Union and who would defect to them before the 1919 election.

Results

References

1917 elections in Australia
Victorian federal by-elections
1910s in Victoria (Australia)